Lophoptychium is an extinct lychniscosidan hexasterophoran sea sponge which is a subgenus of Coeloptychium. Its remains have been found in Santonian-Maastrichtian-aged deposits in Germany and Poland. The type species, L. lobatum, was originally named as a species of Coeloptychium in 1826 but it was moved to a separate subgenus in 1872.

References 

Fossil taxa described in 1872
Hexactinellida
Prehistoric sponges
Animal subgenera